Edward Hunt may refer to:

 Edward Hunt (Surveyor of the Navy) British shipbuilder and designer
 Edward Hunt (politician), Australian businessman and politician
 Edward Hunt (architect), British architect
 Edward Eyre Hunt Jr., American physical anthropologist and human biologist
 Ed Hunt, mountain bike racer